Hallaj in Iran may refer to:
 Hallaj-e Olya
 Hallaj-e Sofla